Barróg was a style of folk wrestling practiced in Ireland until the early 20th century. It was a type of backhold wrestling, similar to Scottish Backhold and Cumberland and Westmorland wrestling.

Name
In the Irish language, the word “barróg” simply means “hug” or “embrace”. From there, it came to be used as the Irish name for backhold wrestling, in reference to the fact that both competitors were required to engage with each other in a chest-to-chest, hug-like clinch.

Occasionally the style was referred to by the anglicised version of its name - Barrogue. On at least one occasion, it was misspelled in an American source as “Borrogbe wrestling”.

History
There are several folk wrestling styles of Western Europe and Northern Europe that involve competitors taking each other in a backhold clinch, such as the aforementioned Scottish Backhold and Cumberland and Westmorland styles, as well as a now-extinct variant of Icelandic Glima known as hryggspenna (“back-spanning”). It is unknown exactly when Barróg arose – or arrived – in Ireland, but there are carved depictions of figures in recognisable backhold clinches dating as far back as the 9th century AD.

The characteristic backhold grip is mentioned in two separate 15th-century accounts of battlefield wrestling - one in the Cath Finntrágha and another in the Táin Bó Flidhais. The Mac Suibhne (Sweeney) clan of Donegal incorporated backhold wrestling imagery on a 16th-century memorial slab for one of their more prominent members, Niall Mór Mac Suibhne. The same clan once used a wrestling match to decide a dispute over leadership. Such matches were a common form of entertainment in more recreational settings as well, as evidenced by Irish genealogist Edward MacLysaght's description of competitors at a 17th-century country fair wrestling in what he called a “hug” position.

By the 18th and 19th century, Irish wrestling both at home and abroad had become dominated largely by the Collar and Elbow style, but there are records of Barróg matches persisting in the west of Ireland until the early decades of the 20th century.

Rules
There is no record of any written ruleset for Barróg, so it is unclear exactly how bouts were conducted. Given the extent to which the other backhold styles of Europe resemble each other, it is probable that Barróg contests utilised a similar framework. That is, an entirely standing style of wrestling in which one competitor wins when they make the other touch the ground with anything other than the soles of their feet. This is supported by an account of backhold wrestling from Sligo that appears in the Irish Folklore Commission's Schools' Collection.

In addition, it was noted that Barróg in the west of Ireland had certain features in common with the backhold wrestling practised in the Hebrides, such as the phrase uttered by referees at the beginning of a bout: "Lámh in íochdar, lámh in uachdar" ("One hand down, one hand up").

Gallery

See also
 Collar-and-elbow
 Scottish Backhold
 Cornish wrestling
 Cumberland and Westmorland wrestling

Footnotes 

9th-century establishments in Ireland
20th-century disestablishments in Ireland
European martial arts
Folk wrestling styles
Sport in Ireland
Sports originating in Ireland
Historical European martial arts